Alexius is the Latinized form of the given name Alexios (polytonic , "defender", cf. Alexander), especially common in the later Byzantine Empire. The female form is Alexia and its variants such as Alessia (the masculine form of which is Alessio) in Italian.

The name belongs to the most ancient attested Greek names (a-re-ke-se-u in the Linear B tablets KN Df 1229 and MY Fu 718).

Rulers 
 Alexios I Komnenos (1048–1118), Byzantine emperor
 Alexios II Komnenos (1167–1183), Byzantine emperor
 Alexios III, Byzantine emperor
 Alexios IV, Byzantine emperor
 Alexios V Doukas, Byzantine emperor
 Alexios I of Trebizond, Emperor of Trebizond
 Alexios II of Trebizond, Emperor of Trebizond
 Alexios III of Trebizond, Emperor of Trebizond
 Alexios IV of Trebizond, Emperor of Trebizond
 Alexios V of Trebizond, Emperor of Trebizond
 Alexius Mikhailovich (1629–1676), Tsar of Russia
 Alexius Petrovich (1690–1718), Russian tsarevich

Religious figures
 Alexius, Metropolitan of Moscow (1354–1378)
 Patriarch Alexius I of Constantinople (1025–1043)
 Alexius (c. 1425–1488), Russian archpriest who converted to Judaism
 Patriarch Alexius I of Moscow and All Russia (r. 1945–1970)
 Patriarch Alexius II of Moscow and All Russia (r. 1990–2008)
 Alexius of Nicaea, metropolitan bishop
 Saint Alexius of Rome, fifth-century eastern saint
 Alexius, a monk and saint of Kiev - see Abraham and Onesimus of Kiev

Other
 Alexios Apokaukos, Byzantine statesman
 Alexios Aspietes, Byzantine governor
 Alexios Branas, Byzantine general
 Alexios Halebian, American tennis player
 Alexius Meinong, Austrian philosopher
 Alexios Mosele (Caesar), Byzantine heir-apparent
 Alexios Palaiologos (despot), Byzantine heir-apparent
 Alexios Philanthropenos, Byzantine general
 Alexios Raoul (protovestiarios), Byzantine general
 Alexios Strategopoulos, Byzantine general
 Alexios Xiphias, Byzantine Catepan of Italy
 Alexios (Assassin's Creed), a fictional character in Assassin's Creed: Odyssey

Given names of Greek language origin
Greek masculine given names
Given names